Modern pentathlon is an Asian Games event first held at the 1994 in Hiroshima, Japan.

Editions

Events

Medal table

Participating nations

List of medalists

References

External links
International Pentathlon Federation

 
Sports at the Asian Games
Asian Games
Asian GAmes